Elmwood is an unincorporated community in Saline County, in the U.S. state of Missouri.

History
Elmwood was platted in 1867. A variant spelling was "Elm Wood". A post office called Elm Wood was established in 1851, and remained in operation until 1907.

References

Unincorporated communities in Saline County, Missouri
Unincorporated communities in Missouri